Imbabura may refer to:

Imbabura Province, Ecuador
Imbabura Volcano, Ecuador
Imbabura Sporting Club, a professional football club based in Ibarra, Ecuador
Imbabura (cicada), a genus of cicadas